The England cricket team toured Bangladesh in March 2023 to play three One Day International (ODI) and three Twenty20 International (T20I) matches. The ODI series formed part of the inaugural 2020–2023 ICC Cricket World Cup Super League. It was the first bilateral T20I series between the two teams, and England's first tour of Bangladesh since 2016.

Originally, the tour was scheduled to take place in September and October 2021, with the T20I matches having been used as preparation  for the 2021 ICC Men's T20 World Cup. However, in August 2021, the tour was postponed due to fixture congestion and the ongoing COVID-19 pandemic.

The Bangladesh Cricket Board (BCB) confirmed that they were in talks with the England and Wales Cricket Board (ECB) to reschedule the matches before the cut-off time of the Super League. On 3 August 2021, the ECB confirmed that the tour had been re-arranged for March 2023. On 27 December 2022, both BCB and ECB confirmed the fixtures of the tour. However, later in January 2023, the tour's practice matches were cancelled by the ECB due to non-availability of several players and a busy international schedule.

England won the ODI series with 2–1 margin, ending Bangladesh's 7 years unbeaten run in ODI series at home since 2016.

Bangladesh won the first T20I match of the series, which was their first win against England and their 50th win in T20Is. They also defeated England in the rest two games to grasp the series 3–0.

Squads

On 16 February 2023, Tom Abell was ruled out of England's squad with a side strain. On 25 February 2023, ECB announced Will Jacks as Abell's replacement in England's ODI squad. However, on 5 March 2023, Jacks was ruled out of last ODI and the T20I series due to a left thigh injury.

On 2 March 2023, Shamim Hossain was added to Bangladesh's ODI squad.

ODI series

1st ODI

2nd ODI

3rd ODI

T20I series

1st T20I

2nd T20I

3rd T20I

References

External links
 Series home at ESPNcricinfo

2023 in Bangladeshi cricket
2023 in English cricket
International cricket competitions in 2022–23
English cricket tours of Bangladesh
Cricket events postponed due to the COVID-19 pandemic